Editors' Council is a national organization of newspaper editors in Bangladesh that campaigns for freedom of speech and freedom of the press. Mahfuz Anam of The Daily Star and Dewan Hanif Mahmud, editor of Bonik Barta are the President and General Secretary of the council.

History

Editors' Council was established in 2013. The founding members were AMM Bahauddin (Daily Inqilab), Alamgir Mohiuddin (Daily Naya Diganta), Anwar Hossain Manju (The Daily Ittefaq), A. H. M. Moazzem Hossain (The Financial Express), Imdadul Haq Milon (Kaler Kantho), Khondoker Muniruzzaman (The Sangbad), Mahbubul Alam (The Independent), Mostafa Kamal Majumder (The New Nation), MA Malek (The Azadi), Mozammel Haque (Korotoa), Matiur Rahman (journalist) (Prothom Alo), Naem Nizam (Bangladesh Pratidin), Shyamal Dutta (Bhorer Kagoj), and Taslim Uddin Chowdhury (Dainik Purbokone). Golam Sarwar (Samakal) was elected the first President, Mahfuz Anam (The Daily Star) was elected General Secretary, and Matiur Rahman Chowdhury (Manabzamin) the treasurer.  

The council has campaigned against the section 32 of the Digital Security Act, which they described as an attack on Freedom of Speech. The council also protested the filling of case under the Digital Security Act against Manabzamin and its Editor-in-Chief Matiur Rahman Chowdhury by Saifuzzaman Shikhor, Member of Parliament from Magura-1.

Mahfuz Anam of The Daily Star and Naem Nizam of the Bangladesh Pratidin were elected the President and General Secretary of the council in September 2019. But Naem Nizam had resigned from his post in protest against what he termed the council chief Mahfuz Anam's "unethical" activities. Then Dewan Hanif Mahmud, editor of Bonik Barta and deputy general secretary of the organisation, becomes acting general secretary of the council.

In March 2022, Anam and Mahmud was again appointed as the president and the general secretary of Editors' Council.

References

2013 establishments in Bangladesh
Organisations based in Dhaka
Trade associations based in Bangladesh
Labour relations in Bangladesh
Bangladeshi journalism organisations